Varoomshka was a British satirical and erotic comic strip by New Zealand cartoonist John Kent that ran in The Guardian from 1969 to 1979. The title character, a buxom and generally scantily-clad young woman, was an everywoman used by Kent to poke fun at the prominent British politicians of the day such as prime ministers Harold Wilson and Edward Heath, and Education Secretary Margaret Thatcher.

References

External links
 https://www.theguardian.com/media/2003/apr/19/pressandpublishing.guardianobituaries
 The Independent

British comic strips
1969 comics debuts
Comics about politics
Satirical comics
Gag-a-day comics
Erotic comics
British comics characters
Comics characters introduced in 1969
1979 comics endings
Comics about women
Female characters in comics
Comics set in the 1960s
Comics set in the 1970s